"China in Your Hand" is a song by English pop group T'Pau, released from their debut album, Bridge of Spies (1987). A re-recorded version was released as a single in October 1987, spending five weeks at number one in the UK, although their debut single "Heart and Soul" was a much bigger hit in the United States. "China in Your Hand" was the 600th single to top the UK charts and kept George Harrison's "Got My Mind Set on You" from hitting the top spot. The song also peaked at number one in Belgium, Iceland, Ireland, the Netherlands, Norway and Switzerland. In 2015, the song was voted by the British public as the nation's 11th favourite 1980s number one in a poll for ITV, and in 2017 was chosen by The Daily Telegraph as one of the 21 best power ballads.

Background
The song's lyrics refer to the novel Frankenstein and its author Mary Shelley. This is more readily heard on the longer album version of the song, as the re-recorded single edit omits most of the more obvious references to the book. The song's title was more unclear however and when quizzed, co-writer Ron Rogers was unsure of its source material. Lyric writer Carol Decker explained that it is the effect that if you hold a china cup to a light, you can see your hand through it – therefore "china in your hand" means something that is transparent. In a segment on the BBC1's The One Show on 6 March 2014, Carol Decker explained that she had been holding a china tea cup belonging to Ronnie Rogers' mother in her hand while washing up and had felt a lump in the bottom. She held the cup to the light and saw an image of a young woman in the base of the cup. Decker had the cup with her and showed the viewers the image.

The song is in the key of B-Flat major on the original album version, but the radio edit version is slightly sped up to reduce its length, resulting in the tuning being midway between B-Flat and B Major.

Other versions
In 2011, contestant Amelia Lily performed the song on series 8 of UK's The X Factor. Judge Gary Barlow said it was "nice to hear the song being sung in tune for once", in mockery of Decker, who reacted to the comment via Twitter. Barlow would apologize later.

Another song with the same title charted for the band Fusion in 1999.

Track listing
 7" vinyl
A. "China in Your Hand" (Carol Decker, Ron Rogers) – 4:07 (Sax solo by Gary Barnacle: guitarist Dean Howard)
B. "No Sense of Pride" (T'Pau) – 3:25

 12" vinyl
A1. "China in Your Hand" (Full Length Album Version) (5:06)
B1. "China in Your Hand" (Single Edit) – 4:07
B2. "No Sense of Pride" – 3:25

Charts

Sales and certifications

See also
List of number-one singles from the 1980s (UK)
List of number-one hits in Norway
List of number-one hits of 1987 (Switzerland)
List of Dutch Top 40 number-one singles of 1988

References

External links

1987 songs
1987 singles
1980s ballads
T'Pau (band) songs
Irish Singles Chart number-one singles
Number-one singles in Iceland
Number-one singles in Norway
Number-one singles in Switzerland
Ultratop 50 Singles (Flanders) number-one singles
UK Singles Chart number-one singles
Song recordings produced by Roy Thomas Baker
Songs written by Carol Decker
Songs written by Ron Rogers
Pop ballads
Songs about Frankenstein's monster